"America Kicks Ass" is a song by avant-garde band King Missile. It was the only single from the band's 2004 album Royal Lunch.

Content
In "America Kicks Ass," frontman John S. Hall, backed by an ominous string section and sporadic bursts of white noise, assumes the persona of an enraged American aggressively in favor of American jingoism and militarism. Hall screams the lyrics, including such sentiments as: The lyrics satirize this jingoistic mindset.

Reception
Music critic Robert Christgau named "America Kicks Ass" a "Choice Cut" in his August 3, 2004 Consumer Guide.

References

King Missile songs
2004 singles
Experimental rock songs
Songs written by John S. Hall
2004 songs
Songs written by Bradford Reed